The 2021 Individual Speedway Under 21 World Championship was the 45th edition of the FIM Individual Under-21 World Championship. It will be staged over three rounds, at Stralsund, Krosno and Pardubice.

Pole Jakub Miśkowiak won the title after winning two of the three rounds. It was the last time that the event was known as the Under 21, with a rebranding due to take place in 2022 called the SGP2.

Final series

Final Standings

See also 
 2021 Speedway Grand Prix
 2021 Team Speedway Junior World Championship

References 

 
2021
Individual Speedway Junior World Championship